Dee McLachlan (born Duncan McLachlan; 4 March 1951) is a film director, producer and writer from Middle Park, Victoria. Under her assigned name, McLachlan directed such films as Scavengers, The Double 0 Kid, Running Wild, Deadly Chase and The Second Jungle Book: Mowgli & Baloo.

In 1999 McLachlan moved to Australia, where she publicly transitioned gender and changed her name to Dee. Her credits include The Jammed, a film for which she won IF Awards for Best Feature Film and Best Script She also received nominations for Best Editing at the IF Awards, Best Film, Best Direction and Best Original Screenplay at the AFI Awards, and for Best Director, Best Film and Best Screenplay at the FCCA awards She followed up The Jammed with 2012's 10 Terrorists.

Filmography
 2019 - The Wheel
 2017 - Out of the Shadows
 2014 - Wentworth (TV series)
 2012 - 10 Terrorists
 2011 - Everest the Promise
 2007 - The Jammed
 1997 - The Second Jungle Book: Mowgli & Baloo
 1995 - Running Wild
 1993 - Deadly Chase
 1993 - The Double 0 Kid

Author
McLachlan founded Gumshoe News in 2013 and along with Mary W Maxwell has written and published over 2,000 articles. McLachlan and Maxwell have co-authored two books: Enough is Enough (on the Port Arthur massacre in Tasmania) and Truth in Journalism. Mclachlan has written five children's books.

References

External links

Dee McLachlan, writer/director of The Jammed speaks with WSWS, 21 September 2007, Richard Phillips on the World Socialist Web Site

South African emigrants to Australia
Living people
Australian film directors
Australian women film directors
Australian film producers
Australian screenwriters
LGBT film directors
Australian LGBT screenwriters
Transgender women
Transgender writers
1951 births
South African LGBT writers
Writers from Cape Town
21st-century LGBT people
People from the City of Port Phillip